The tennis competition at the 2014 Central American and Caribbean Games was held in Veracruz, Mexico.

The tournament was scheduled to be held from 24–30 November at the Las Palmas Racquet club.

Medal summary

Men's events

Women's events

Mixed event

Men's singles

Seeds

Draw

Finals

Top half

Bottom half

Women's singles

Seeds

Draw

Finals

Top half

Bottom half

Men's doubles

Seeds

Draw

Draw

Women's doubles

Seeds

Draw

Draw

Mixed

Seeds

Draw

Draw

Medal table

References

External links
Official Website

2014 Central American and Caribbean Games events
Central American and Caribbean Games
2014